Cutting, Carleton & Cutting was an American architectural firm, with offices in Worcester, Massachusetts, active from 1895 to 1932.

It was established in 1895 by Amos P. Cutting, Elbridge S. Carleton, and Frank H. Cutting, son of Amos. The elder Cutting established the firm while he was in ill health, so that he could step back from active office work. He died in February 1896, but Carleton and Cutting continued the firm until Carleton's death in 1932. Cutting continued on alone.

The firm of Cutting, Carleton & Cutting is associated with the design of at least four properties individually placed on the National Register of Historic Places, and its works contribute to several more listed historic districts.

Architectural works
 1895 - Mathewson Street M. E. Church, 134 Mathewson St, Providence, Rhode Island
 1896 - Gilman Building, 215 Main St, Worcester, Massachusetts
 Demolished in 2004.
 1897 - Fogg Library, 1 Columbian Sq, South Weymouth, Massachusetts
 1898 - Sigma Alpha Epsilon Fraternity House, 6 Humboldt Ave, Worcester, Massachusetts
 1900 - Dudley Free Public Library (Former), 1 Village St, Dudley, Massachusetts
 1900 - Johnston's Block (Baker Building), 68-72 Church St, Whitinsville, Massachusetts
 1902 - Franklin Square Theatre, 2 Southbridge St, Worcester, Massachusetts
 1903 - Charles Larned Memorial Library, 339 Main St, Oxford, Massachusetts
 1906 - Oxford High School (Old), 351 Main St, Oxford, Massachusetts
 1908 - Ralph L. Morgan House, 96 William St, Worcester, Massachusetts
 1908 - Tatnuck School, 1083 Pleasant St, Tatnuck, Massachusetts
 1910 - Rochdale School, 1098 Stafford St, Rochdale, Massachusetts
 1914 - Edmund E. Hills Estate (Hillswold Farm), 575 Hartford Hpk, Shrewsbury, Massachusetts
 1923 - Hadley Furniture Building, 657 Main St, Worcester, Massachusetts
 1927 - May Street School, 265 May St, Worcester, Massachusetts
 1929 - Lincoln Street School, 549 Lincoln St, Worcester, Massachusetts
 1931 - Major Edwards High School (Former), 70 Crescent St, West Boylston, Massachusetts

References

Defunct architecture firms based in Massachusetts
Companies based in Worcester, Massachusetts
Design companies established in 1895
Design companies disestablished in 1932
1895 establishments in Massachusetts
1932 disestablishments in Massachusetts